The national colours of Israel are azure and white as seen on the flag of Israel.

History
Blue and white are perceived as patriotic colours in the State of Israel and the Jewish world. Blue and white is used in flags, symbols, etc. Eg: Blue-White (Blau-Weiss) Zionist youth moment in Germany and Blue and white (He) patriotic song.
Book of Numbers mentions in 15:38, it states that the Israelites were commanded to put fringes on the corners of their garments, and to put a cord of blue border upon these fringes.

See also 
 Blue and White (political alliance)
 Blue in Judaism
 National colours
 National symbols of Israel

References 

National colours
National symbols of Israel